Highway 201 is a highway in the Canadian province of Saskatchewan. It runs north from the Trans-Canada Highway near Broadview.

Highway 201 passes through the Kahkewistahaw First Nation.

The highway also provides access to Crooked Lake Provincial Park at Crooked Lake and Bird's Point Recreation Site at Round Lake in the Qu'Appelle Valley.

References

External links
Crooked Lake Provincial Park

201